The Producers Guild of America Award for Outstanding Producer of Animated Theatrical Motion Pictures is an award annually given since 2005.

Disney and Pixar’s Toy Story is the first and to date only franchise with multiple wins, thanks to Toy Story 3 (2010) and Toy Story 4 (2019).

Information
Before the Producers Guild of America handed the first outstanding award on animation, animated films competed against live-action films in the Best Theatrical Motion Picture category. Two animated films were nominated in that category:
 2001 – Shrek (lost to Moulin Rouge!)
 2004 – The Incredibles (lost to The Aviator)

Since the inception of the Best Animated Motion Picture award, animated films can still be nominated for Best Theatrical Motion Picture. Two animated films were nominated since 2005:
 2009 – Up (lost to The Hurt Locker)
 2010 – Toy Story 3 (lost to The King's Speech)

Winners and nominees

2000s

2010s

2020s

Multiple nominations and wins

References

Animated Motion Picture
Awards for best animated feature film
Awards established in 2005